Michal Šrom (born 25 December 1987) is a Czech football player who currently plays for FC Tescoma Zlín. He made his Gambrinus liga debut on 30 May 2009 in a 6–1 defeat away at Jablonec.

References

Czech footballers
Czech First League players
1987 births
Living people
FC Fastav Zlín players
Association football midfielders